The 2007 International GT Open season was the second season of the International GT Open, the grand tourer-style sports car racing founded in 2006 by the Spanish GT Sport Organización. It began on 21 April at ACI Vallelunga Circuit and finished on 11 November, at Barcelona after six double-header meetings with one single race round.

Overall championship was won by Autorlando drivers Joël Camathias and Richard Lietz, GTA class was won by Scuderia Playteam SaraFree drivers Michele Maceratesi and Andrea Montermini, while GTS class title was clinched by Riccardo Romagnoli.

Race calendar and results

References

External links
 

International GT Open
International GT Open seasons